Longwood House is a mansion in St. Helena and the final residence of Napoleon Bonaparte, the former Emperor of the French, during his exile on the island of Saint Helena, from 10 December 1815 until his death on 5 May 1821.

History
Longwood "was originally a farm belonging to the East India Company and was afterwards given as a country residence to the Deputy-Governor." It was converted for the use of Napoleon in 1815. The British government eventually recognized its inadequacy as a home for the former emperor and his entourage and, by the time of his death, had built a new house for him nearby, which he never occupied. In February 1818, Governor Sir Hudson Lowe proposed to Lord Bathurst to move Napoleon to Rosemary Hall, a house that became available and was located in a more hospitable part of the island, sheltered from the winds and shaded, as Napoleon had preferred. But the revelations of General Gourgaud in London brought Lord Bathurst to the opinion that it was safer to keep Napoleon at Longwood, where an escape was harder to undertake. The building of the new house only began in October 1818, three years after Napoleon's arrival on the island.

The will written by Napoleon at Longwood House is preserved in French National Archives.

After Napoleon's death
Following Napoleon's death, Longwood House reverted to the East India Company and later to the Crown, and was used for agricultural purposes. Reports of its neglect reached Napoleon III who, from 1854, negotiated with the British government for its transfer to France. In 1858 it was transferred to the French government, along with the Valley of the Tomb for a sum of £7,100.  Since then they have been under the control of the French Foreign Ministry and a French government representative has lived on the island and has been responsible for managing both properties. In 1959 a third property, The Briars, where Napoleon spent the first two months while Longwood was being prepared, was given to the French government by Dame Mabel Brookes.

As a result of the depredations of termites, in the 1940s the French government considered demolishing the building. New Longwood and the Balcombe's house at The Briars were both demolished at this time, but Longwood House was saved, and it has been restored by recent French curators. The stone steps at the front are the only part of the original fabric to survive.

In 2006 Michel Dancoisne-Martineau donated the heart-shaped Waterfall Valley to the Saint Helena National Trust. In 2008 he donated the land surrounding the pavilion at The Briars to the French republic.

Longwood House is now a museum owned by the French government. It is one of two museums on the island, the other being the Museum of Saint Helena.

See also

Napoleon § Exile on Saint Helena
French domains of St Helena
Longwood, Saint Helena
Longwood, Featherston

Further reading
 Jean-Paul Kauffmann, La Chambre noire de Longwood : le voyage à Sainte-Hélène (1997), La Table Ronde, prix Roger Nimier, prix Joseph Kessel, . 
The Dark Room at Longwood (2000), .

References

External links
 
 in French

Palaces and residences of Napoleon
French government properties on Saint Helena
History of Saint Helena
Museums in Saint Helena
Properties of the East India Company
Napoleon museums